About 25,000 inscriptions found in Karnataka and states near by belongs to Kannada rulers like Kadambas, Western Ganga Dynasty, Rashtrakuta, Chalukya, Hoysala and Vijayanagara Empire. Many inscriptions related to Jainism are unearthed. The inscriptions generally found are on stone (Shilashasana) or copper plates (Tamarashasana). The Kannada inscriptions (Old Kannada, Kadamba script) found on historical Hero Stone, coin and temple wall, piller, tablet and rock edict. These Inscription have contributed towards Kannada literature and helped to classify as Proto Kannada, Pre Old Kannada, Old Kannada, Middle Kannada and New Kannada. Inscriptions depicts culture, tradition and prosperity of those era. The world wide recognized literature  Ramayana  and  Mahabharata  are transferred through generation by these Inscription  Hazara Rama Temple   and Aranmula Parthasarathy Temple are the best example.

Earliest Kannada inscriptions

The first written record in Kannada traced to Ashoka's Brahmagiri edict dating back to around 250 BC, Tagarthi inscription dates back to 350 AD. The stone inscription (dated 370 CE) found at Talagunda near Shiralakoppa in the taluk during excavation by the Archaeological Survey of India (ASI) in 2013-14 is now said to be the earliest Kannada inscription. Nishadi Inscription of 400 AD of Chandragiri hill (Shravanabelagola), Halmidi inscription of 5th century AD  and Aihole inscriptions are very important in the history of Kannada and Karnataka. 5th century Tamatekallu inscription of Chitradurga and 500 CE Chikkamagaluru inscription. The earliest known Kannada inscription in Bengaluru region traced to the reign of Sripurusha was discovered in 2018 in Hebbal. There are few Kannada words found in the edicts and inscriptions those are prior to the Christian era in places as far as Egypt.
 
Brahmagiri rock inscription of Ashoka

Ashoka rock edict at Brahmagiri in Chitradurga district is the ancient site of Ishila. An inscription there contains this most ancient Kannada word.
The earliest recorded word of Kannada is Isila occurring in the Brahmagiri rock inscription of 252 BC (similar to many other inscriptions with Kannada words).

Tagarthi inscription

A Dr. S. Shettar completed a detailed palaeographic study over 10 years, finding five to six inscriptions that are older than Halmidi inscription (in Poorvada Halegannada dialect). The inscription is a mix of Brahmi, Kannada and Nagari scripts. One of those found at Tagarthi
(within the Gangavadi region in Shimoga district) dates to 350 AD, during the Ganga dynasty.
This study pushed the date push back by at least a century. 
The historian Suryanath Kamath also agree with the findings of Dr S. Shettar.

Gunabhushitana Nishadi inscriptionM. G. Manjunath an epigraphist Mysore based scholar discovered 400 AD Gunabhushitana Nishadi inscription 
of Jainism one of the 271 inscriptions on Chandragiri hill of Shravanabelagola found near Parshwanatha Basadi, which is 50 years older than Halmidi inscription. It is mentioned in the Epigraphia Karnataka. There are Prakrit, Sanskrit and Purvada Halegannada (Old Kannada words. The four lined inscription has six words. The inscription is in Shatavahana Brahmi and Aadi Ganga script. 
M. Chidananda Murthy also agree that Gunabhushitana Nishadi Shasana was a Kannada inscription (in Purvada Halegannada script).

Halmidi inscription

The 5th century AD  Halmidi inscription 16-line earliest Kannada inscription found at Halmidi in Belur taluk of Hassan district on rectangular sandstone ( 2.5 ft height and 1 ft width) has a Vishnu Chakra on its top. The language of the inscription is in Poorvada Halegannada ( Proto-Kannada). Archaeologist M. H. Krishna found the Brahmi script in the inscription. Shifted the inscription to Archaeological Museum, Mysore and later to Government Museum in Bangalore. Epigraphia Karnataka has dedicated a chapter to study of the inscription. 
The linguists and writers Govinda Pai, M. Chidananda Murthy, T. V. Venkatachala Sastry, Ram Sri Mugali, R.S. Panchamukhi, D.L. Narasimhachar, and M. M. Kalburgi studied the inscription and published papers. Writers including G. S. Gai, T. A. Gopinatha Rao, T. N. Srikantaiah, Shivarama Aithala, S. Nagaraju, S. Srikanta Sastri, M. Mariyappa Bhatta, M. B. Neginahal, K. V. Ramesh, Devarakondareddy and K. M. Hanumantha Rao have discussed the important issues raised by Halmidi inscription in their books.

Tamatakallu inscriptions
Chitradurga district is home for most ancient inscriptions written in archaic Kannada script. 
As per epigraphist Dr. B. Rajashekharappa the inscriptions known as Veeragallu at Tamatakal village written in Kannada script belongs mostly to end of Fifth Century or beginning of Sixth Century, describes the nature and achievements of Gunamadhura who ruled Masikapura (ancient name of Tamatakal), he was frivolous, generous and kind person. he was a favourite among women (Despite being of dark complexion), because of his kind nature. In 1903 by the historian late B. L. Rice discovered the inscriptions, Dr. Rajashekharappa found new aspects.

Karnataka inscriptions of Kannada dynasties

The Karnataka inscriptions are mainly categories as mentioned below
Kadambas inscriptions
 Halmidi inscription - Kadamba Coins and the earliest Kannada inscription 
 Talagunda pillar inscription
 Halasi Inscriptions of Kadambas of Halasi
 Chandravalli rock inscription. 
 In AD 475-490 Mrigesavarman of Kadambas of Halasi inscription there is mention about Yapaniya.

Western Ganga Dynasty inscriptions

 The 981 CE Old Kannada inscription at Vindyagiri Shravanabelagola
 Hebbal-Kittayya inscription at Hebbal, Bangalore
 Doddahundi nishidhi inscription
 Atakur inscription
 The 983 CE Tyagada Brahmadeva Pillar at Shravanabelagola
 Shravanabelagola inscription of Nandisena 
 Tumbula inscriptions of 444 AD, Sanskrit-Kannada inscription, the Kannada words are used to describe the land boundaries.
 Western Ganga Kannada writings

Chalukya inscriptions
 The 634CE Aihole inscription of Ravi Kirti (minister and poet of Badami Chalukya Pulakeshin II) available at the Meguti temple, the inscription is a eulogy of Pulakeshin II and his conquests.
Mahakuta Pillar
 Kappe Arabhatta
 Badami Inscriptions
 Gadag inscription of Vikramaditya VI
 Sudi Inscriptions
 610AD Peddavaduguru inscription of Pulakeshin II

Rashtrakuta inscriptions
 Kavirajamarga
 Ninth century Kannada stone inscription of Rashtrakuta period unearthed near Tumbi Kere (tank) at Halekumur village in Byadgi Takuk. The inscription is about Rashtrakuta rulers donating 200 acres to Siddarevar Singh to construct a tank.
 Navalinga Temple inscriptions Kuknur.
 Northernmost Kannada inscription of the Rashtrakutas of 964 AD is the Jura record found near Jabalpur in Madhya Pradesh.
 Inscriptions related to Dantidurga

Hoysala inscriptions

Vijayanagara Empire inscriptions

Vengi Chalukya inscriptions 

Yadava inscriptions

Kalachuri Inscriptions

Kannada copper plates and manuscripts

 The 8th century AD oldest Kannada copper plate inscription found at Belmannu in Karkala taluk of Udupi district.
 Western Ganga Dynasty Tumbula inscriptions of 444 AD
 The 8th century AD Aluvarasa II of Alupas copper plate inscription in Kannada.
 The 1430 AD Vijayanagara empire Devarajapuram copper plate inscription having state-deity Virupaksha's signature at the bottom in Kannada script to certify a grant of land to Brahmins (by King Devaraya II (1425-1446)).

Coins bearing Kannada inscription

 The 5th Century copper coin in archaic Kannada script found at Banavasi. One side has five letter inscription Sri Manaragi and symbol of Ujjain on other side. 
 Coins bearing Kannada inscription
 Pagodas and Fanams with Kannada inscription were the coinage of Alupas.
 Kadamba Coins
 Lari (fish hook money)
 Sudi and Lakkundi coins mint (Tankhashaley)
 Honnu or Gadyana of Hoysala
 Kalachuri Kannada Coinage

Kannada inscriptions found outside Karnataka

Many Kannada inscriptions found outside Karnataka mainly Maharashtra, Tamil Nadu and Andhra Pradesh.

Kannada inscriptions found in Andhra Pradesh
Andhra Pradesh has numerous Kannada inscriptions.
 Kannada inscription of Gooty in Andhra Pradesh.
 At Tirumala Venkateswara Temple at Tirupati there are about 50 inscriptions available in Telugu and Kannada.
 Inscription (in Kannada-Telugu script) of Vijayanagara empire found at Kadimetla in Yemmiganur mandal of Kurnool district.
 The 10th century AD. Copper plates of Amma II of Eastern Chalukya in Kannada-Telugu script available at National Museum New Delhi.
 The 15th Century Rare inscription traces route to Tirumala written in Kannada found in a mango orchard in Krishnampalle of T. Kammapalle panchayat (in Pullampet mandal) in Kadapa district. The inscription with the portrait of Tallapaka Pedda Tirumalarayudu (eldest son of saint lyricist Tallapaka Annamacharya) and Sankham, Chakram and Namam of Lord Vishnu.

Kannada inscriptions found in Maharashtra
 The Karhad copper plates in Kannada from Maharashtra is about after the defeat of Rajaditya in Takkolam the Krishna III's distribution of the raid of war; among his people at Melpadi military camp (Tamil Nadu) and also there is mention that Krishna III's invasion of the Chola territory was also to provide livelihood for his people.
 Majority of the inscriptions found at Bombay (Mumbai) are in Prakrit, Sanskrit and few are in Kannada. Out of the inscriptions found two belongs to Chalukyas, one to Kadambas, two to Rashtrakutas, eight to Shilaharas, one to Yadavas of Devagiri.
 Shilaharas Kannada inscriptions, Silharas of Kolhapur used Kannada in inscriptions.
 Maharashtra is mentioned as Maharashtraka (Great districts or provinces) in 580 CE Chalukya inscription.
 Many historical inscriptions mentioned Kolhapur as Kollgiri, Kolladigirpattan, Kshullakpur Kollapur and Kollpur, particularly the word Kollpur originated from Kannada language.
 Kannada inscriptions of Solapur district of Maharashtra
 Inscriptions at Ellora
 The 11th - 12th Century AD period Kannada Inscription of Chalukya Vikramaditya VI found at Beed Maharashtra

Kannada inscriptions found in Tamil Nadu
The Kannada inscription of Rashtrakuta king Krishna III period (of Tenth century CE) found at Melpadi village in Vellore district of Tamil Nadu. It is mentioned as the endowment was made in the presence of Krishna III's feudatories (Rattas and Bitti Raja of Melpadi). Krishna III was praised as Akalavarsha Deva, Prithvi Vallabha, Maha Rajathiraja, Parameshvara, Parama Bhattaraka and Chaleka Nallathan and it indicats that he was about to accomplish his conquests of Kancheepuram and Thanjavur.
The Kannada inscriptions found at Kanchipuram, Dharmapuri region, Vazhaithottam in Nilgiri District, Jain Palli at Alathur in Avinasi taluk, Coimbatore District and Karamadai copper plate inscription. Avinashi Temple inscription in Coimbatore, Kanchi inscription of Vikramaditya, Sittannavasal inscription, Melpadi inscription of Rastrakuta Krishna III, Madras Kannada Herostone inscription, Kodumbalur inscription of Irukkuvelir Chiefs and Hero-stone inscriptions in Kondaharahalli are the inscriptions in Kannada.

Other parts of the world
 The stone scripture found in Doleshwor of Nepal written in Kannada.
 Pyu sites of Myanmar yielded variety of Indian scripts including Kannada inscription.
 The Deopara inscription describes the Senas as Karnata Kshatriyas and Brahma-Kshatriyas''.

Research institute of Kannada manuscripts
 Oriental Research Institute Mysore
 Oriental Research Institute & Manuscripts Library
 National Institute of Prakrit Studies and Research - Prakrit and Kannada manuscripts

People associated with Kannada inscriptions and manuscripts
 People associated with the study of Kannada inscriptions
 Shivakotiacharya's Vaddaradhane
 Nagavarma I
 Phakirappa Gurubasappa Halakatti
 Aluru Venkata Rao
 Parabrahma Sastry

See also
 Sritattvanidhi
 Kannada inscriptions in Karnataka
Kannada inscriptions in Bengaluru
Inscription stones in Bengaluru
 Gazetteer of the Bombay Presidency
 Early epigraphy of Kannada
 Charition mime
 Shabdamanidarpana
 Epigraphy of old Kannada
 Extinct Kannada literature
 List of State Protected Monuments in Karnataka
 Kadamba script
 Modi script Hemadpant Hemadpanthi
 Kannada-Telugu script
 Nakara guild
 Sena dynasty Kannada Origin
 Linguistic history of the Indian subcontinent#History of Kannada
 Palaeography - India
 List of museums in Karnataka

References

External links
 
 Kannada inscriptions
 Pâli, Sanskṛit and Old Canarese Inscriptions from the Bombay Presidency and ... By John Faithful Fleet, James Burgess
 The Indian temple forms in Karṇātạ inscriptions and architecture
 Department of Ancient History and Archaeology Kannada University Hampi Karnataka
 Kannada Research Institute (KRI) Karnataka University Dharwad
 Ancient History and Archaeology Mysore Karnataka 
 Temples of Karnataka
 Kannada inscriptions that mention Basavanna/Basaveshwara/Basavayya
 Inscriptions related to Vithoba

 
Linguistic history of India
Historiography of India
History of Karnataka
 
Literature of Karnataka
Asian archaeology
Archaeological artefact types
Archaeology of India
Inscriptions by languages